Kemalism (also archaically Kamâlizm), also known as Atatürkism, or The Six Arrows, is the founding official ideology of the Republic of Turkey. Kemalism, as it was implemented by Mustafa Kemal Atatürk after the declaration of Republic in 1923, was defined by sweeping political, social, cultural and religious reforms designed to separate the new Turkish state from its Ottoman predecessor and embrace a Western-style modernized lifestyle, including the establishment of secularism/laicism, state support of the sciences, free education, women's rights, and many more. Most of those were first introduced to and implemented in Turkey during Atatürk's presidency through his reforms.

Many of the root ideas of Kemalism began during the late Ottoman Empire under various reforms to avoid the imminent collapse of the Empire, beginning chiefly in the early 19th-century Tanzimat reforms. The mid-century Young Ottomans attempted to create the ideology of Ottoman nationalism, or Ottomanism, to quell the rising ethnic nationalism in the Empire and introduce limited democracy for the first time while maintaining Islamist influences. In the early 20th century, the Young Turks abandoned Ottoman nationalism in favor of early Turkish nationalism, while adopting a secular political outlook. After the demise of the Ottoman Empire, Atatürk, influenced by both the Young Ottomans and the Young Turks, as well as by their successes and failures, led the declaration of the Republic of Turkey in 1923, borrowing from the earlier movements' ideas of secularism and Turkish nationalism, while bringing about, for the first time, free education and other reforms that have been enshrined by later leaders into guidelines for governing Turkey.

Philosophy
Kemalism is a modernization philosophy that guided the transition between the multi-religious, multi-ethnic Ottoman Empire to the secular, democratic, and unitary Republic of Turkey. Kemalism sets the boundaries of the social process in the Turkish Reformation. Atatürk was the founder of Kemalism, and his doctrine was implemented as state ideology, but Atatürk refrained from being dogmatic and described his and his spiritual heirs' guide to be science and reason:

Principles
There are six principles (ilke) of the ideology: Republicanism, Populism, Nationalism, Laicism, Statism, and Reformism. Together, they represent a kind of Jacobinism, defined by Atatürk himself as a method of employing political despotism to break down the social despotism prevalent among the traditionally-minded Turkish-Muslim population, caused by, he believed, the bigotry of the ulema.

Republicanism
Republicanism in the Kemalist framework replaced the absolute monarchy of the Ottoman dynasty with the rule of law, popular sovereignty and civic virtue, including an emphasis on liberty practiced by citizens. Kemalist republicanism defines a type of constitutional republic, in which representatives of the people are elected, and must govern in accordance with existing constitutional law limiting governmental power over citizens. The head of state and other officials are chosen by election rather than inheriting their positions, and their decisions are subject to judicial review. In defending the change from the Ottoman State, Kemalism asserts that all laws of the Republic of Turkey should be inspired by actual needs here on Earth as a basic tenet of national life. Kemalism advocates a republican system as the best representative of the wishes of the people.

Among the many types of republic, the Kemalist republic is a representative, liberal parliamentary democracy with a Parliament chosen in general elections, a president as head of state elected by Parliament and serving for a limited term, a prime minister appointed by the president, and other ministers appointed by Parliament. The Kemalist president does not have direct executive powers, but has limited veto powers, and the right to contest with referendum. The day-to-day operation of government is the responsibility of the Council of Ministers formed by the prime minister and the other ministers. There is a separation of powers between the executive (president and Council of Ministers), the legislative (Parliament) and the judiciary, in which no one branch of government has authority over another—although parliament is charged with the supervision of the Council of Ministers, which can be compelled to resign by a vote of no-confidence.

The Kemalist republic is a unitary state in which three organs of state govern the nation as a single unit, with one constitutionally created legislature. On some issues, the political power of government is transferred to lower levels, to local elected assemblies represented by mayors, but the central government retains the principal governing role.

Populism

Populism is defined as a social revolution aimed to transfer the political power to citizenship. Kemalist populism intends not only to establish popular sovereignty but also the transfer of the social-economic transformation to realize a true populist state. However, Kemalists reject class conflict and collectivism. Kemalist populism believes national identity is above all else. Kemalist populism envisions a sociality that emphasizes class collaboration and national unity like solidarism. Populism in Turkey is to create a unifying force that brings a sense of the Turkish state and the power of the people to bring in that new unity.

Kemalist populism is an extension of the Kemalist modernization movement, aiming to make Islam compatible with the modern nation-state. This included state supervision of religious schools and organizations. Mustafa Kemal himself said "everyone needs a place to learn religion and faith; that place is a mektep, not a madrasa". This was intended to combat the "corruption" of Islam by the ulema. Kemal believed that during the Ottoman period, the ulema had come to exploit the power of their office and manipulate religious practices to their own benefit. It was also feared that, were education not brought under state control, unsupervised madrasas could exacerbate the rising problem of tarikat insularity that threatened to undermine the unity of the Turkish state.

Sovereignty
Kemalist social theory (populism) does not accept any adjectives placed before the definition of a nation [a nation of ...] Sovereignty must belong solely to people without any term, condition, etc.:

Motto
Populism was used against the political domination of sheiks, tribal leaders, and Islamism (Islam as a political system) of the Ottoman Empire. Initially, the declaration of the republic was perceived as "Returning to the days of the first caliphs". However, Atatürk's nationalism aimed to shift the political legitimacy from autocracy (by the Ottoman dynasty), theocracy (based in the Ottoman caliphate), and feudalism (tribal leaders) to the active participation of its citizenry, the Turks. Kemalist social theory wanted to establish the value of Turkish citizenship. A sense of pride associated with this citizenship would give the needed psychological spur for people to work harder and achieve a sense of unity and national identity. Active participation, or the "will of the people", was established with the republican regime and Turkishness replacing the other forms of affiliations that had been promoted in the Ottoman Empire (such as the allegiance to the different millets that eventually led to divisiveness in the empire). The shift in affiliation was symbolized with:

The motto "Ne mutlu Türküm diyene" was promoted against such mottoes as "long live the Sultan," "long live the Sheikh", or "long live the Caliph."

Laicism

Laicism in Kemalist ideology aims to banish religious interference in government affairs, and vice versa. It differs from the passive Anglo-American concept of secularism, but is similar to the concept of laïcité in France.

The roots of Kemalist secularism lie in the reform efforts in the late Ottoman Empire, especially the Tanzimat period and the later Second Constitutional Era. The Ottoman Empire was an Islamic state in which the head of the Ottoman state held the position of the Caliph. The social system was organized according to various systems, including the religiously organized Millet system and Shari'ah law, allowing religious ideology to be incorporated into the Ottoman administrative, economic, and political system. This way of life is today defined as Islamism (political Islam): "the belief that Islam should guide social and political as well as personal life". In the Second Constitutional Era, the Ottoman Parliament pursued largely secular policies, although techniques of religious populism and attacks on other candidates' piety still occurred between Ottoman political parties during elections. These policies were stated as the reason for the countercoup of 1909 by Islamists and absolute monarchists. The secular policies of the Ottoman parliament also factored in the Arab Revolt during World War I.

When secularism was implemented in the fledgling Turkish state, it was initiated by the abolition of the centuries-old caliphate in March 1924. The office of Shaykh al-Islām was replaced with the Presidency of Religious Affairs. In 1926, the mejelle and shari'ah law codes were abandoned in favor of an adapted Swiss Civil Code and a penal code modeled on the German and Italian codes. Other religious practices were done away with, resulting in the dissolution of Sufi orders and the penalization of wearing a fez, which was viewed by Atatürk as a tie to the Ottoman past.

State and religion (Laïcité)
Atatürk was profoundly influenced by the triumph of laïcité in France. Atatürk perceived the French model as the authentic form of secularism. Kemalism strove to control religion and transform it into a private affair rather than an institution interfering with politics, as well as scientific and social progress. "Sane reason," and "the liberty of [one's] fellow man," as Atatürk once put it. It is more than merely creating a separation between state and religion. Atatürk has been described as working as if he were Leo the Isaurian, Martin Luther, the Baron d'Holbach, Ludwig Büchner, Émile Combes, and Jules Ferry rolled into one in creating Kemalist secularism. Kemalist secularism does not imply nor advocate agnosticism or nihilism; it means freedom of thought and independence of the institutions of the state from the dominance of religious thought and religious institutions. The Kemalist principle of laicism is not against moderate and apolitical religion, but against religious forces opposed to and fighting modernization and democracy.

According to the Kemalist perception, the Turkish state is to stand at an equal distance from every religion, neither promoting nor condemning any set of religious beliefs. Kemalists, however, have called for not only separation of church and state but also a call for the state control of the Turkish Muslim religious establishment. For some Kemalists, this means that the state must be at the helm of religious affairs, and all religious activities are under the supervision of the state. This, in turn, drew criticism from the religious conservatives. Religious conservatives were vocal in rejecting this idea, saying that to have a secular state, the state can't control the activities of religious institutions. Despite their protest, this policy was officially adopted by the 1961 constitution.

Kemalism must stamp out the religious element within society. After Turkish independence from the Western powers, all education was under the control of the state in both secular and religious schools. It centralized the education system, with one curriculum in both religious and secular public schools, in the hope this would eliminate or lessen the appeal of religious schools. The laws were meant to abolish the Sufi religious schools or orders (tarikats) and their lodges (tekkes). Titles like sheikh and dervish were abolished, and their activities were banned by the government. The day of rest was changed by the government from Friday to Sunday. But the restrictions on personal choice extended to both religious duty and naming. Turks had to adopt a surname and were not allowed to perform the hajj (pilgrimage to Mecca).

Politics and religion (Secularism)
The Kemalist form of separation of state and religion sought the reform of a complete set of institutions, interest groups (such as political parties, unions, and lobbies), the relationships between those institutions, and the political norms and rules that governed their functions (constitution, election law). The biggest change in this perspective was the abolishment of the Ottoman caliphate on March 3, 1924, followed by the removal of its political mechanisms. The article stating that "the established religion of Turkey is Islam" was removed from the constitution on April 10, 1928.

From a political perspective, Kemalism is anti-clerical, in that it seeks to prevent religious influence on the democratic process, which was a problem even in the largely secular politics of the Second Constitutional Era of the Ottoman Empire, when even non-religiously affiliated political parties like the Committee of Union and Progress and the Freedom and Accord Party feuded over matters such as the Islamic piety of their candidates in the Ottoman elections of 1912. Thus, in the Kemalist political perspective, politicians cannot claim to be the protector of any religion or religious sect, and such claims constitute sufficient legal grounds for the permanent banning of political parties.

Insignia
The Ottoman social system was based on religious affiliation. Religious insignia extended to every social function. Clothing identified citizens with their own particular religious grouping; headgear distinguished rank and profession. Turbans, fezes, bonnets, and head-dresses denoted the sex, rank, and profession — both civil and military — of the wearer. Religious insignia outside of worship areas became banned.

While Atatürk considered women's religious coverings as antithetical to progress and equality, he also recognized that headscarves were not such a danger to the separation of church and state to warrant an outright ban. But the Constitution was amended in 1982, following the 1980 coup by the Kemalist-leaning military, to prohibit women's use of Islamic coverings such as the hijab at higher education institutions. Joost Lagendijk, a member of the European Parliament and chair of the Joint Parliamentary Committee with Turkey, has publicly criticized these clothing restrictions for Muslim women, whereas the European Court of Human Rights has ruled in numerous cases that such restrictions in public buildings and educational institutions do not constitute a violation of human rights.

Reformism
Reformism is a principle which calls for the country to replace the traditional institutions and concepts with modern institutions and concepts. This principle advocated the need for fundamental social change through reform as a strategy to achieve a modern society. The core of the reform, in the Kemalist sense, was an accomplished fact. In a Kemalist sense, there is no possibility of return to the old systems because they were deemed backward.

The principle of reformism went beyond the recognition of the reforms made during Atatürk's lifetime. Atatürk's reforms in the social and political spheres are accepted as irreversible. Atatürk never entertained the possibility of a pause or transition phase during the course of the progressive unfolding or implementation of the reform. The current understanding of this concept can be described as "active modification". Turkey and its society, taking over institutions from Western Europe, must add Turkish traits and patterns to them and adapt them to Turkish culture, according to Kemalism. The implementation of the Turkish traits and patterns of these reforms takes generations of cultural and social experience, which results in the collective memory of the Turkish nation.

Nationalism
Nationalism: The Kemalist revolution aimed to create a nation state from the remnants of the multi-religious and multi-ethnic Ottoman Empire. Atatürk's nationalism originates from the social contract theories, especially from the civic nationalist principles advocated by Jean-Jacques Rousseau and his Social Contract. The Kemalist perception of social contract was facilitated by the dissolution of the Ottoman Empire, which was perceived as a product of failure of the Ottoman "Millet" system and the ineffective Ottomanism policy. Atatürk's nationalism, after experiencing the Ottoman Empire's breakup, defined the social contract as its "highest ideal".

Kemalist ideology defines the "Turkish Nation" as a nation of Turkish people who always love and seek to exalt their family, country and nation, who know their duties and responsibilities towards the democratic, secular and social state governed by the rule of law, founded on human rights, and on the tenets laid down in the preamble to the constitution of the Republic of Turkey. Atatürk defines the Turkish Nation by saying

Similar to its CUP predecessors, it can be said that Kemalism endorsed social Darwinism in some way by desiring the Turkish youth to be healthy and physically strong.

Criteria

Kemalist criteria for national identity or simply being Turkish refers to a shared language, and/or shared values defined as a common history, and the will to share a future. Kemalist ideology defines the "Turkish people" as:

Membership is usually gained through birth within the borders of the state and also the principle of jus sanguinis. The Kemalist notion of nationality is integrated into the Article 66 of the Constitution of the Republic of Turkey. Every citizen is recognized as a Turk, regardless of ethnicity, belief, and gender, etc. Turkish nationality law states that he or she can be deprived of his/her nationality only through an act of treason.

Kemalists saw non-Muslims as only nominal citizens, and they have often been treated as second-class citizens in the Republic of Turkey. The identity of Kurds in Turkey was denied for decades with Kurds described as "Mountain Turks". Kemal stated in 1930:

In 2005, the Article 301 of the Turkish Penal code made it a crime to insult Turkishness, but under pressure of the EU, this was changed in 2008 to protect the "Turkish nation" instead of Turkish ethnicity in 2008, an 'imagined' nationhood of people living within the National Pact borders.

Pan-Turkism

Kemalism focused on the nation-state's narrower interests, renouncing the concern for the "Outside Turks".

Pan-Turkism was an ethnocentric ideology [to unite all ethnically Turkic nations] while Kemalism is polycentric [united under a " common will"] in character. Kemalism wants to have an equal footing among the mainstream world civilizations. Pan-Turkists have consistently emphasized the special attributes of the Turkic peoples, and wanted to unite all of the Turkic peoples. Kemalism wants an equal footing (based on respect) and does not aim to unite the people of Turkey with all the other Turkic nations. Most Kemalists were not interested in Pan-Turkism and from 1923 to 1950 (the single state period) reacted with particular firmness. Further more, Atatürk opposed Pan-Turkism in his book Nutuk as following:

However, Atatürk owned the idea of taking Turkicness as one of the identities of Turkish nation. Turkish History Thesis started under Atatürk's order and administration, which contained ethno-racial ideas based on Turkish origins coming from Central Asia. Also Atatürk era high school books contained education of Orkhon alphabet and a unit under the title of "Greater Turkic history and Civilization". The book also gave detailed information about empires which are Turkic such as Göktürks or "claimed to be Turkic" such as Scythians, Xiongnu, and so on.

With the supports of newly founded Turkish Republic, Pan-Turkist organization known as "Turkish Hearths", re-established in Atatürk's era to get Turkists' support during the revolutions. Atatürk was frequently giving speeches on Turkish Hearths after important events occurred in Turkey. Also reopening of Turkish magazine "Türk Yurdu" which was an organ of Turkish Hearts, was supported. Later, in 1931, Turkish Hearts were closed by Atatürk after they lost their non-political stance, because of their Pan-Turkist views and movements; and with all of its premises, it merged to the ruling party CHP.

Atatürk also described his opinions about Timur, a Central Asian Turkic military commander as "If I lived in Timur's timeline, I wouldn't be able to accomplish his work but if he lived in my timeline, he would do greater than I did".

Turanism

Kemalist center of view focused on the Turkish people, within both living and historical cultures and peoples of Anatolia, especially Hittites, and the culture and civilization of Turkic peoples.

Turanism centered the nation as the union of all Turanian peoples (Tungus, Hungarians, Finns, Mongols, Estonians and Koreans) stretching from the Altai Mountains in Eastern Asia to the Bosphorus. Kemalism had a narrower definition of language, which sought to remove (purify) the Persian, Arabic, Greek, Latin, etc. words from the Turkish language and replace them with either Turkic originated words or derive new words with Turkic roots. Turanist leaders, such as Enver Pasha, wanted an evolving language common to all Turanian peoples, minimizing differences and maximizing similarities between them.

Kemalism and the Hittites 

Kemalism gave an important place to Hittites and the Hittite symbolism to construct the Turkish identity and nationhood. Kemalist researchers, such as Ahmet Ağaoğlu (who was an advisor to Atatürk and a politician who played an important role on creating Turkey's constitution of 1924), believed in that the nation has to portray Hittites as a world-domineering Turkish race with firm roots in Anatolia.
Modern genetic researches on Turkish samples show that Anatolian Turks are mixage of Turkic tribes and Anatolian natives, however, unlike Kemalist thoughts, these two admixtures aren't originated from same ethnicity, race or identity.

Statism

Statism: Atatürk made clear in his statements and policies that Turkey's complete modernization was very much dependent on economic and technological development. The principle of Kemalist statism is generally interpreted to mean that the state was to regulate the country's general economic activities and engage in areas where private enterprises are not willing to do so. This was the result of post-revolutionary Turkey needing to redefine the relationship between societal and international capitalism. The revolution left Turkey in ruins, as the Ottoman Empire was focused on raw materials and was an open market in the international capitalist system. Post-revolutionary Turkey has been largely defined by its agricultural society, which includes many landlords and merchants. The control of people in the Turkish economy is quite evident from 1923 to the 1930s, but they still managed, through foreign joint investment, to establish a state economic enterprise. However, after the 1930s depression, there was a shift to more inward-looking development strategies during an era generally referred to as "etatism". During this era, the state had an active involvement in both capital accumulation and investment as well as in taking the interest of private businesses into consideration. The state often stepped into economic areas that the private sector did not cover, either due to not being strong enough or having simply failed to do so. These were often infrastructure projects and power stations, but also iron and steel industries, while the masses shouldered the burden of the capital accumulation.

Analysis

Kemalism and Turkey's political parties

The Republican People's Party (CHP) was established by Mustafa Kemal Atatürk on September 9, 1923, not long before the declaration of the Republic of Turkey on October 29. The Republican People's Party did not attempt to update or define the philosophical roots of it party Kemalism from the 1940s to the 1960s. However, since the 1960s, there has been a move to the left-of-center. The supporter of the left-of-center accepts the tented of the Kemalism also entrained the idea that structural changes brought forth by the government are necessary for modernization. Later in the 1970s, the CHP had to make fundamental changes to its party platform as the country Abandonment of Kemalism. The party thought several programs as being labeled the democratic left. Most still believe in the six principles of Kemalism while others seek to reduce the role of statism in Turkish society. The Turkish Justice Minister Mahmut Esat Bozkurt equated the Kemalist policies to the Italian fascism of Benito Mussolini. Bozkurt is also mentioned together with Ahmet Cevat Emre and Yakup Kadri Karaosmanoğlu as one of the few who introduced the term Kemalism with its political aspects.

Kemalism and Turkey's constitutional law
The six principles were solidified on 5 February 1937, 14 years after establishment of the Republic of Turkey.

In the 1924 Constitutional Law Article 2, Clause 1:

Both the military coup of 1960 and the military coup of 1980 were followed by fundamental revisions of the Turkish Constitution. The texts of the new constitutions were approved by popular referendum in each case.

In the 1961 Constitutional Law Article 1, Clause 1 states "The Turkish State is a Republic." Article 2, Clause 1:

In the 1982 Constitutional Law Article 1, Clause 1 states "The Turkish State is a Republic." Article 2, Clause 1:

Only the principles of secularism, nationalism and democracy were maintained in each change to the constitution. The 1961 Constitution more strongly emphasized human rights, the rule of law, and the welfare state than the original 1924 constitution, while the 1982 constitution focused on the peace of the community and national solidarity, but also explicitly referenced some of Atatürk's principles and included them as well.

External interpretations of Kemalism

In the 1920s and 1930s, Turkey's domestic transformations and the evolution of the Kemalist system of ideological and political principles were closely observed in Germany, France, Britain, the US, and beyond, including several nations farther East. In recent years, scholarly interest in the transnational history of Kemalism has expanded. Some scholars have focused on the interwar period in Bulgaria, Cyprus, Albania, Yugoslavia, and Egypt to reveal how, as a practical tool, Kemalism was relocated as a global movement, whose influence is still felt today. Some scholars have examined the impact of Atatürk's reforms and his image on the Jewish community in British-ruled Palestine before the establishment of Israel, some went farther East—to Persia, Afghanistan, China, India, and other parts of the Muslim world—to assess the influence wielded by Mustafa Kemal and his modernization project. These works explore perceptions of Kemalism that are mostly positive in their respective countries providing few critical insights into Kemalism's evolution and its reception as an ideological project. 
Against this background, one of the critical partners of Turkey in the interwar period – the Soviet Union, its leaders, party bureaucrats, journalists and scholars initially interpreted Kemalism as an ideological ally in the struggle against the West. Since the late 1920s until the 1950s, Kemalism was viewed negatively by the Communists. In the 1960s and 1970s, the Soviet position returned to normalization. Views and analyses of Soviet leaders, diplomats, party functionaries, and scholars helps us grasp the underlying dynamics behind these changing attitudes. Placing them in the larger context of republican history—delineating phases in the Kemalist paradigm of development and discerning its various rises and falls—will enrich our knowledge of the transnational history of Kemalism.

The Nazis viewed Kemalist Turkey as a "postgenocidal paradise" worthy of emulation. Nazis often stated that Nazism and Kemalism were very similar. In 1933, Nazis openly admired Kemalist Turkey. Hitler described Mustafa Kemal as the "star in the darkness".

Although Kemalist secularism has deep roots in Enlightenment era thought, the postmodernist movement in Western philosophy has, since the 1960s and 1970s, cast the Enlightenment in a negative light. Postmodernist thinkers like Jacques Derrida have assaulted the Western hegemony and imperialism associated with European colonialism. The declining appeal of secularism, perceived as a Western value, has given occasion to postmodernist cultural relativism emphasizing the populist appeal of collective religious identities like the political Islam espoused by Recep Tayyip Erdoğan's AKP.

See also
Bourguibism
Liberal Kemalism
Peronism
Pancasila
Post-Kemalism
Three Principles of the People

References

Further reading

 
Mustafa Kemal Atatürk
Political ideologies
Political movements in Turkey
Eponymous political ideologies
Republican People's Party (Turkey)
Republicanism in Turkey
Progressivism
Secularism in Turkey
Statism
Turkish nationalism
State ideologies